Harm Vanhoucke (born 17 June 1997 in Kortrijk) is a Belgian cyclist who currently rides for UCI WorldTeam . In August 2019, he was named in the startlist for the 2019 Vuelta a España.

On 21 March 2020, Vanhoucke was assaulted by a car driver during a training ride. He claims to have been punched several times by an aggressive heavily built man. In October 2020, he was named in the startlist for the 2020 Giro d'Italia.

Major results

2015 
 3rd Overall Oberösterreich Juniorenrundfahrt
 8th Grand Prix Bati-Metallo
 9th La Philippe Gilbert Juniors
 10th Overall GP Général Patton
2016
 1st Piccolo Giro di Lombardia
 1st Stage 2 Tour des Pays de Savoie
 4th Overall Tour Alsace
 9th Overall Tour de l'Avenir
2017 
 1st Flèche Ardennaise
 3rd Overall Tour de Savoie Mont Blanc
 4th Overall Grand Prix Priessnitz spa
 4th Overall Ronde de l'Isard
2018
 3rd Time trial, National Under-23 Road Championships
 6th Overall Tour du Jura
2020
 1st  Mountains classification, Tour Poitou-Charentes en Nouvelle-Aquitaine
 10th Overall Vuelta a Andalucía
 10th Trofeo Serra de Tramuntana
2021
 2nd Overall Tour de l'Ain
2022
 5th Overall Tour of Turkey
2023
 10th Overall UAE Tour

Grand Tour general classification results timeline

References

External links

1997 births
Living people
Belgian male cyclists
Sportspeople from Kortrijk
Cyclists from West Flanders
21st-century Belgian people